The Las Cruces Vaqueros were a professional baseball team based in Las Cruces, New Mexico that began play in 2010 and ended in 2015. The Vaqueros played in the Pecos League of Professional Baseball Clubs, an independent baseball league which is not affiliated with Major or Minor League Baseball.

Las Cruces Vaqueros played their home games at Apodoca Park, which seats 1,500 fans. The team did not field a team in the Pecos League in 2013, though they did participate in the Pecos Spring League in March 2013. The team returned to the Pecos League for 2015, though did not return in 2016.

Year-by-year record

External links
Las Cruces Vaqueros home page

Pecos League teams
Professional baseball teams in New Mexico
2010 establishments in New Mexico
Defunct independent baseball league teams
Baseball teams established in 2010
Defunct baseball teams in New Mexico
Baseball teams disestablished in 2015
Sports in Las Cruces, New Mexico